The Nimba shrew (Crocidura nimbae) is a species of mammal in the family Soricidae. It is found in Ivory Coast, Guinea, Liberia, and Sierra Leone. Its natural habitat is subtropical or tropical moist lowland forests.

References

Nimba shrew
Mammals of West Africa
Guinea–Ivory Coast border
Nimba shrew
Taxonomy articles created by Polbot
Taxa named by Henri Heim de Balsac